"Fine Again" is the debut single by South African rock band Seether, released in 2002. The song first appeared on the 2000 album Fragile (which was released when Seether were still going by the name Saron Gas). It was also later included on the 2002 EP 5 Songs, and it is the third track on their 2002 debut studio album Disclaimer.

During live shows, Shaun Morgan has been known to dedicate the song to Dave Williams of Drowning Pool as well as Dimebag Darrell of Pantera.

Morgan wrote the song after his parents got divorced.

Music video
The video for the song, directed by Paul Fedor, features the band playing on a soundstage while three walls behind them display filmstrip slides of people holding opaque rectangles with phrases depicting their inner feelings on them explaining the reason why they feel down, and broken hearted (which is similar to the album cover). Seether arranged for the concept to be implemented on the cover art to Disclaimer. Ten different versions of the album were released, each featuring a photo of a person from the video. According to bassist Dale Stewart:

Seether came up with the idea of the people baring their souls and holding up the signs and we thought it was a good concept. It's kind of like a thread that runs through the whole album, the fragility, or whatever you want to call it, you know in people. People are always screwed up about something. It doesn't matter if they act like they're not as if they're alright. So therefore, there are times where everybody feels a broken heart.

Appearances
"Fine Again" was featured on the 2002 video game Madden 2003, Nintendo's 1080° Avalanche, and the film Boy Erased.

Track listing

Chart positions

References

2000 songs
2002 debut singles
Seether songs
Hard rock ballads
Wind-up Records singles
Songs written by Dale Stewart
Songs written by Shaun Morgan